Satakunnan derby is a name used for ice hockey matchups between Porin Ässät and Rauman Lukko of the Liiga. Lukko and Ässät are placed into the same block, which means that they play six games against each other in one Liiga season. Both teams also participate in the Pitsiturnaus. Ässät and Lukko have met in playoff games five times (1992, 1995 and 2018), Ässät has won all five of them.

Events during Satakunnan derby games 
12 January 1978, Ässät beat Lukko 17–3. Ässät won the championship during that season while Lukko was last place.
In the 1994–1995 season, Ässät and Lukko met in the bronze medal game on April 1, 1995, in Rauma ice hall. Ässät beat Lukko 0–3.
In the 2008-2009 season, according to the renewed series system, the 11th-placed Lukko and the 12th-placed Ässät met in the playout matches after the regular season in the second round, where the loser of the best-of-five series continued their season in the SM-liiga qualifiers, and the season of the winner ended. Lukko won the series 3-1 and Ässät went to the SM-liiga qualifiers against Mestis champion Vaasan Sport. Ässät only barely managed to keep their SM-liiga spot after the game seven.
During the 2018 playoffs, Ässät and Lukko met in the first round. Ässät won the first game 2–1 and the second game 3–2 in overtime, which made Ässät advance to the next round.
On February 29, 2020, in the Satakunnan derby, Otto Kivenmäki was seriously injured when Lukko's David Němeček hit him in the head.

References 

Ässät
Lukko
Liiga
Ice hockey rivalries
Sports rivalries